UHC Waldkirch-St.Gallen is a Swiss floorball team out of Waldkirch and St. Gallen, which plays in the highest Swiss league.

History 
The club was founded in 1997 through the fusion of the club UHC St.Gallen and the TSV Waldkirch. In the season 2002/03 WaSa were promoted to the national league A for the first time in the club's history. After two season the club out of the Eastern part of Switzerland were relegated to the league B.

Another two years later in 2007/08 they were promoted again. WaSa won the Best-of-five series against the last of the league a Club, Basel Magic, with 3:0. The last game of this series was attempted by more than a thousand visitors.

In 2017 the women team advanced to the highest Swiss league.

Squad 2015/2016

References

External links 
 UHC Waldkirch-St.Gallen

Organisations based in St. Gallen (city)
Swiss floorball teams
Sport in St. Gallen (city)